The Society for the Advancement of Economic Theory abbreviated as SAET is a non-profit membership society founded to "advance knowledge in theoretical economics and to facilitate communication among researchers in economics, mathematics, game theory, or any other field which is potentially useful to economic theory."  Membership includes economists, mathematicians, game theorists, and other individuals with interests in economics based on rigorous theoretical reasoning.

History
The society was founded in 1991 by Charalambos D. Aliprantis, Edward C. Prescott, and Nicholas C. Yannelis. It holds several events every year.

Academic Journals
The Society is responsible for the publication of the peer-reviewed journal Economic Theory, the first edition of which was published in March 1991.

The society also publishes the journal Economic Theory Bulletin, which specializes in shorter papers.

Conferences

The society holds annual conferences that attract a large number of academic economists. The inaugural conference in 1993 was held in the Greek island of Cephalonia. In recent years annual conferences have alternated between European and Asian/South American locations.

Fellows

Economic Theory Fellows in the Society for the Advancement of Economic Theory are elected by the Society's Fellowship Committee for their scientific excellence, originality, and leadership; high ethical standards; and scholarly and creative achievement. The Fellowship Committee includes a nomination subcommittee which is elected by fellows. Foundation Fellows were selected in 2011, and new Fellows have been elected annually from 2012.

Presidents

Edward C. Prescott, 1990-1994
Charalambos D. Aliprantis, 1995-1997
Nicholas C. Yannelis, 1998-2008
Charles R. Plott, 2009-2010
David K. Levine, 2011-2012
Aloisio Araujo, 2013-2014
Bernard Cornet 2015-2016

References

External links

Organizations established in 1991
Economics societies